The Singles, Volume IV: 1966–1967 is the fourth compilation in a series of releases by Hip-O Select Records compiling the singles of James Brown. This compilation features all 7" single releases, including re-issues and canceled singles.

Track listing
Disc 1
"Ain't That a Groove, Pt. 1" (Brown, Nat Jones) – 2:37 – James Brown & the Famous Flames
"Ain't That a Groove, Pt. 2" (Brown, Nat Jones) – 1:47 – James Brown & the Famous Flames
"New Breed (The Boo-Ga-Loo), Pt. 1" (Brown, Nat Jones) – 2:39 – James Brown
"New Breed (The Boo-Ga-Loo), Pt. 2" (Brown, Nat Jones) – 2:23 – James Brown
"It's a Man's Man's Man's World" (Brown, Betty Newsome) – 2:48 – James Brown & the Famous Flames
"Is It Yes or Is It No?" (Brown) – 2:58 – James Brown & the Famous Flames
"James Brown's Boo-Ga-Loo" (Brown, Nat Jones) – 2:17 – James Brown
"Lost in a Mood of Changes" (Brown, Nat Jones) – 1:56 – James Brown
"Money Won't Change You, Pt. 1" (Brown, Nat Jones) – 2:46 – James Brown & the Famous Flames
"Money Won't Change You, Pt. 2" (Brown, Nat Jones) – 2:22 – James Brown & the Famous Flames
"This Old Heart" (Brown) – 2:35 – James Brown & the Famous Flames
"Don't Be a Drop-Out" (Burt Jones) – 3:45 – James Brown & the Famous Flames
"Tell Me That You Love Me" (Brown, Bud Hobgood, Nat Jones) – 1:42 – James Brown & the Famous Flames
"Let's Go Get Stoned" (Jo Armstead, Nickolas Ashford, Valerie Simpson) – 2:44
"Our Day Will Come" (Mort Garson, Bob Hilliard) – 2:44 – James Brown at the Organ
"This Christmas Song [Part 1]" (Mel Tormé, Robert Wells) – 2:43 – James Brown at the Organ
"This Christmas Song [Part 2]" (Mel Tormé, Robert Wells) – 2:47 – James Brown & the Famous Flames
"Sweet Little Baby Boy, Pt. 1" (Brown, Nat Jones) – 2:54 – James Brown & the Famous Flames
"Sweet Little Baby Boy, Pt. 2" (Brown, Nat Jones) – 2:37 – James Brown & the Famous Flames
"Let's Make Christmas Something This Year, Pt. 1" (Brown, Nat Jones) – 2:53 – James Brown & the Famous Flames
"Let's Make Christmas Something This Year, Pt. 2" (Brown, Nat Jones) – 2:57 – James Brown & the Famous Flames

Disc 2
"Bring It Up" (Brown, Nat Jones) – 2:54 – James Brown & the Famous Flames
"Nobody Knows" (Brown, James Crawford) – 3:24 – James Brown & the Famous Flames
"Kansas City" (Jerry Leiber, Mike Stoller) – 3:01 – James Brown & the Famous Flames
"Stone Fox" (Brown, Bud Hobgood) – 2:46 – James Brown & the Famous Flames
"It's a Gas, Pt. 1" (Brown, Bud Hobgood) – 2:37 – The James Brown Dancers
"It's a Gas, Pt. 2" (Brown, Bud Hobgood) – 1:56 – The James Brown Dancers
"Think" (Lowman Pauling) – 3:22 – Vicki Anderson and James Brown
"Let Yourself Go" (Brown) 3:00 – James Brown & the Famous Flames
"Good Rockin' Tonight" (Roy Brown) – 2:27 – James Brown & the Famous Flames
"I Loves You Porgy" (George Gershwin, Ira Gershwin, Dorothy Heyward) – 2:35 – James Brown & the Famous Flames
"Yours and Mine" (Brown, Bud Hobgood) – 2:46 – James Brown & the Famous Flames
"Jimmy Mack" (Holland-Dozier-Holland) – 3:01 – James Brown at the Organ
"What Do You Like" (Alfred "Pee Wee" Ellis) – 2:49 – James Brown at the Organ
"It Won't Be Me" (Brown, Alfred "Pee Wee" Ellis) – 3:37 – James Brown & the Famous Flames
"Mona Lisa" (Ray Evans, Jay Livingston) – 1:57 – James Brown & the Famous Flames
"Cold Sweat, Pt. 1" (Brown, Alfred "Pee Wee" Ellis) – 2:53 – James Brown & the Famous Flames
"Cold Sweat, Pt. 2" (Brown, Alfred "Pee Wee" Ellis) – 3:15 – James Brown & the Famous Flames
"Get It Together, Pt. 1" (Brown, Alfred "Pee Wee" Ellis, Hobgood) – 3:50 – James Brown & the Famous Flames
"Get It Together, Pt. 2" (Brown, Alfred "Pee Wee" Ellis, Hobgood) – 3:54 – James Brown & the Famous Flames
"Get It Together, Pt. 1" [Version 1] (Brown, Alfred "Pee Wee" Ellis, Bud Hobgood) – 3:44 – James Brown & the Famous Flames
"Get It Together, Pt. 2" [Version 2] (Brown, Alfred "Pee Wee" Ellis, Bud Hobgood) – 3:54 – James Brown & the Famous Flames

James Brown compilation albums
2007 compilation albums